Saidabad is in Zamania tehsil of Ghazipur District, Uttar Pradesh, India. It has a population of 1622 and a geographical area of  102.77 hectares. As of 2011 the Literacy rate of Saidabad is 83%, where 93% is for men and 73% for women.

References

Ghazipur district